Fatih Özbaş (born 1 October 1971) is a Turkish wrestler. He competed in the men's freestyle 68 kg at the 1992 Summer Olympics.

References

External links
 

1971 births
Living people
Turkish male sport wrestlers
Olympic wrestlers of Turkey
Wrestlers at the 1992 Summer Olympics
Place of birth missing (living people)